Sylvester Williams (born January 26, 1958) is a retired American basketball player. Born in New Haven, Connecticut. In 1979 he was drafted 21st overall by the New York Knicks and he played parts of seven seasons in the National Basketball Association (NBA) with the New York Knicks, Atlanta Hawks and Boston Celtics, appearing in 305 regular season games and seven in the playoffs. In 1985 he signed for the Celtics, but was released on December 2 after a number of personal issues. The Celtics went on to win the 1986 NBA Finals in his absence. As a member of the Knicks, Williams was the last player to wear No. 33 before Patrick Ewing.

Williams was highly recruited as an All American out of Lee High School in New Haven, Connecticut He averaged 31 points and 22 rebounds per game his senior year, leading his team to the Connecticut state title. He was highly recruited out of High School by schools such as the University of Rhode Island (URI), Providence College, University of Texas, University of Georgia, University of Connecticut and others. He verbally committed to Providence College and is credited with intensifying the rivalry between the URI and Providence College after signing  a letter of intent to attend URI the first day of his fall semester, when he was supposed to arrive at Providence. He spent his whole college career attending URI.

In August 2002 he pleaded guilty to kidnapping charges after allegedly holding a woman captive for about 24 hours and threatening her with a knife in September 2001, and raping a second woman in January 2002. The cases were consolidated and Williams was charged with first-degree rape, sodomy and first-degree kidnapping. He was sentenced to up to five years in prison. Williams was working for a pipe and plastics company at the time of his arrest.

References

External links
Sly Williams NBA statistics at Basketball Reference

1958 births
Living people
21st-century American criminals
African-American basketball players
All-American college men's basketball players
American male criminals
American men's basketball players
American people convicted of kidnapping
American rapists
American sportspeople convicted of crimes
Atlanta Hawks players
Basketball players from New Haven, Connecticut
Boston Celtics players
New York Knicks draft picks
New York Knicks players
Rhode Island Rams men's basketball players
Shooting guards
Small forwards
21st-century African-American people
20th-century African-American sportspeople